Al-Hurriya Sport Club, is an Iraqi football team based in Al-Hurriya, Baghdad, that plays in the Iraq Division Three.

Managerial history
 Mohammed Razzaq
 Hamed Al-Sayyed

See also
 2000–01 Iraqi Elite League
 2001–02 Iraq FA Cup
 2002–03 Iraq FA Cup

References

External links
 Al-Hurriya SC on Goalzz.com
 Iraq Clubs- Foundation Dates

1992 establishments in Iraq
Association football clubs established in 1992
Football clubs in Baghdad